Earl Frederick Ziemke (December 16, 1922 – October 15, 2007) was an American military historian whose work was mainly on World War II and especially the Soviet-German clash in Eastern Europe.

Biography
Earl Ziemke was born on December 16, 1922, in Milwaukee, Wisconsin, and served in the Marines during World War II. After learning Japanese at Camp Elliot, California, Ziemke served in the Pacific. He fought in the Battle of Peleliu and then won the Purple Heart for wounds received in the assault on Okinawa.

At the end of the war, Corporal Ziemke served at Tientsin, China. After his discharge, he used the G.I. Bill to pursue higher education, and in 1951 he received his Ph.D. from the University of Wisconsin.

From 1951 until 1955, he worked at the Bureau of Applied Social Research at Columbia University, while for the period 1955–1967, he was an official historian for the United States Army's Office of the Chief of Military History in Washington, D.C.

In 1967, he went to the University of Georgia as a full professor and in 1977, he rose to the rank of research professor. He retired in 1993 as research professor emeritus.

He occasionally served as an expert witness for the US Justice Department on war crimes trials relating to the Holocaust. He was member in various historical societies, such as The World War II Studies Association.

In 1973, Secretary of the Army Howard “Bo” Callaway presented Ziemke with the Outstanding Civilian Service Award.

Ziemke died on October 15, 2007, and is interred at the Arlington National Cemetery. He was survived by his wife Ida Mae Saltenberger Ziemke, his daughter Caroline F. Ziemke, who worked for the Institute for Defense Analyses, both of Annandale, Virginia, and a sister, June Villa of Milwaukee.

A memorial service was also held at  the Great Episcopal Church of Saint Gregory in Athens, Georgia on December 15.

Select bibliography
Battle for Berlin: End of the Third Reich, Ballantine Books; 2nd edition 1972, ASIN B000KK7YVS
The U.S. Army in the Occupation of Germany, 1944-1946, U.S. Army Center of Military History, 1975, ASIN B0006CN1NK 
The Soviet Juggernaut, Time-Life Books, 1980, 
Stalingrad to Berlin: The German Defeat in the East, Dorset Press, 1986, (Online version - transcribed and formatted by Jerry Holden for the HyperWar Foundation)
Moscow to Stalingrad: Decision in the East, Hippocrene Books, March 1989,  
German Report Series: German Northern Theatre Of Operations 1940-45, 2003, Naval and Military Press, 2009 (reprint of 2003 edition),  
 The Red Army, 1918-1941: From Vanguard of World Revolution to US Ally, Frank Cass, 2004,

See also
 Soviet deep battle military theory

References

External links
 The U.S. Army Center of Military History 

1922 births
2007 deaths
Writers from Milwaukee
University of Wisconsin–Madison alumni
University of Georgia faculty
American military writers
20th-century American historians
Historians of World War II
American military historians
American male non-fiction writers
Burials at Arlington National Cemetery
Writers from Georgia (U.S. state)
United States Marine Corps personnel of World War II
United States Marine Corps non-commissioned officers
Historians from Wisconsin
American expatriates in China